William Henry Waller (May 14, 1835 – December 24, 1885) was mayor of Ottawa in 1877.

He was born at Castle Waller in Newport, County Tipperary, Ireland in 1835 and came to Canada with his family in 1853. He settled in Toronto and was employed at The Globe. In 1861, he came to Ottawa as a member of the editorial staff of the Ottawa Union. He later became an insurance broker in partnership with Roderick O'Connor.

Waller was an alderman on city council from 1874 to 1875 and became mayor upon the death of G. B. Lyon-Fellowes. He served as president of the Capital Mutual Building Society of Ottawa from 1876 to 1874. He was named registrar for Carleton County in 1879.

References

 Historical Sketch of the County of Carleton (1971) - originally published in 1879, reprinted by Mika Press, Belleville, Ontario

External links 
A Cyclopæedia of Canadian biography : being chiefly men of the time ..., GM Rose (1886)

1835 births
1885 deaths
Politicians from County Tipperary
Mayors of Ottawa
Irish emigrants to pre-Confederation Ontario